Taylor G. Petrey is an American scholar of religion and the editor of Dialogue: A Journal of Mormon Thought since 2019. He is an associate professor at Kalamazoo College. In 2016–17, he was a visiting associate professor at Harvard Divinity School and research associate at the Women's Studies in Religion Program. He specializes in gender studies, Early Christianity, and Mormonism. His 2020 book Tabernacles of Clay: Sexuality and Gender in Modern Mormonism has won numerous awards, including "Best Book Award" from the Mormon History Association and a "Choice Outstanding Academic Title" award.

Education and Academic Career

Petrey holds a Bachelor of Arts (2001) from Pace University, a Master of Theological Studies (2003) from Harvard Divinity School and a Doctor of Theology (2010) from Harvard Divinity School. He is the author of numerous books and articles on early Christianity and also the Church of Jesus Christ of Latter-day Saints. He has been a professor at Kalamazoo College since 2010.

Petrey specializes in gender studies and religion and his work has received media attention. He has been interviewed for numerous media outlets on Mormonism.

Selected works
(2011). "Toward a Post-Heterosexual Mormon Theology" 

(2015). Resurrecting Parts: Early Christians on Desire, Reproduction, and Sexual Difference.

(2020). Tabernacles of Clay: Sexuality and Gender in Mormonism. University of North Carolina Press.

References

External links
 

Kalamazoo College faculty
Pace University alumni
Harvard Divinity School alumni
1976 births
Living people